"Calling On" is a single by New Zealand band Weta, off their only studio album Geographica. It peaked at #37 in the New Zealand RIANZ Chart.

Track listing
"Calling On"
"Egg Face"
"Time"
"Calling On (Album Version)"

References

Weta (band) songs
2000 singles
2000 songs
Warner Music Group singles